Masoud Karbasian is an Iranian economist who is the former CEO of National Iranian Oil Company (NIOC), served from 2018 to 2021. He was minister of finance from August 2017 until his impeachment in August 2018. He previously held office as ex-officio vice minister of finance, heading Iran's Customs Administration.

Karbasian holds a Ph.D. in commercial management and has served as a vice minister for heavy industries, petroleum and commerce government ministries.

Views 
He is described as a "technocrat" and reformist.

References

1956 births
Iranian economists
Living people
Politicians from Isfahan
Finance ministers of Iran